"You've Got to Hide Your Love Away" is a song by the English rock band the Beatles. It was written and sung by John Lennon (though credited to Lennon–McCartney) and released on the album Help! in August 1965.

Composition and recording
Lennon said of the song, "That's me in my Dylan period again. I am like a chameleon, influenced by whatever is going on. If Elvis can do it, I can do it. If the Everly Brothers can do it, me and Paul can. Same with Dylan." The song is an early example of John self-reflecting in his writing, which had begun with songs such as "I'm a Loser" in the summer of 1964. Lennon wrote the song at home, wanting another song for the film Help!. The song "is just basically John doing Dylan", Paul McCartney confirmed. The song is similar to a folkish strophic form and uses a Dylanesque acoustic guitar figure in compound duple time, normally committed to score in 6/8 or 12/8 time, with chiefly acoustic accompaniment, no backing voices and light percussion from brushed snare, tambourine and maraca. A flute, however, replaces the harmonica that Dylan typically used.

The song's lyrics are ambiguous. Potentially, Lennon could have been referring to the fact that, as a Beatle, he was expected to keep the fact he was married a secret. He could also have been writing about his inability to express his true 'loving' self in public and his feelings of isolation and paranoia related to fame. Some, such as singer Tom Robinson, have suggested that the song was written for the Beatles' manager Brian Epstein, who had to hide his homosexuality from the public. Lennon himself, however, never publicly discussed his inspiration for the lyrics. When the song was first written, Lennon used "two-foot tall" to rhyme with the "wall" in the first verse, but mistakenly said "two-foot small" when he sang the line to McCartney, and decided to keep it this way. Pete Shotton, Lennon's former bandmate from The Quarrymen, was present when the song was being composed, and suggested adding "Hey" to the start of the line in the refrain.

The basic rhythm track was recorded first, followed by George Harrison's guitar and some extra percussion. John Scott recorded a tenor flute in the spaces in Lennon's vocal track and an additional alto flute part, an octave higher than the first, on the last available track of the four-track machine.

Performance in the film
In the film Help!, at the opening of the song, the head of the cult, Clang (Leo McKern), appears from underneath a manhole cover in the middle of Ailsa Avenue, London, where parts of the film were shot. He stays there for the whole song, which the Beatles play in Lennon's quarters of the Beatles' shared flat. The flute part of the song is performed by George's in-house gardener (Bruce Lacey). They are watched by Ahme (Eleanor Bron), and at the end of the song, Harrison passes out after Ahme produces a giant needle for Starr, who is wearing the ring the cult is seeking.

Other studio tracks
In a montage, the first two takes (both broken down) are followed by a completed alternative version (Take 5), included on Anthology 2. Lennon counts off the song then stops to readjust the microphone ("I'm just going to raise this so as it's nearer the bass strings than the top string"). This is followed by the sound of a glass shattering on the floor, prompting John to teasingly sing: "Paul's broken a glass, broken a glass. Paul's broken a glass. A glass, a glass he's broke today". (In the background, Ringo plays the snare drum with brushes, keeping time with John's cadence). John also addresses Paul as "Macca," a nickname in England for someone who has "Mc" in their last name: "Oh, you ready, Macca?"

Personnel
 John Lennon – lead vocals, 12-string acoustic guitar
 Paul McCartney – bass guitar
 George Harrison – classical acoustic guitar
 Ringo Starr – brushed snare drum, tambourine, maracas
 John Scott – tenor and alto flutes

Cover versions

 The Beach Boys covered the song in 1965 on their album Beach Boys' Party! with a lead vocal by their drummer Dennis Wilson. The album reached number 6 on the US Billboard 200 and number 3 in the UK.
 The Silkie, a band that had been signed by Brian Epstein, recorded their version a few months after the Beatles. Lennon produced the session, while McCartney contributed guitar and Harrison tambourine. Their version peaked at #10 on the U.S. Billboard Hot 100 and peaked at #28 on the UK Singles Chart.
 Oasis, as a bonus track on the deluxe edition reissue of their album (What's the Story) Morning Glory? from 2014.  It originally was released as a bonus track in Japan only.
 Waylon Jennings covered the song in 1967 on his album Love of the Common People
 It appeared in the Glee episode "Love, Love, Love", sung by Kitty Wilde (Becca Tobin) and Artie Abrams (Kevin McHale).
 A cover performed by grunge musician Eddie Vedder appeared in the soundtrack of the 2001 film I Am Sam.

References

External links

 

1960s ballads
Pop ballads
The Beatles songs
The Beach Boys songs
Fontana Records singles
Jan and Dean songs
Song recordings produced by George Martin
Songs written for films
Songs written by Lennon–McCartney
Songs published by Northern Songs
1965 songs